Crazy Love Tour was the fourth concert tour by Canadian singer Michael Bublé. The tour supported his sixth studio album, Crazy Love (2009). Visiting the Americas, Europe, Australia, Asia, and Africa, the tour has played to over one million spectators in nearly 21 countries. The tour has received remarkable praise from both music critics and spectators of the show. In 2010, Pollstar announced the trek became the sixth highest-grossing tour worldwide, earning over $100 million with 99 sold-out shows. Additionally was the fourth highest-grossing tour in North America—bringing in over $60 million in revenue with 50 sold-out shows. The tour ranked 16th in Pollstar's "Top 50 Worldwide Tour (Mid-Year)", earning over 30 million dollars in 2011. At the conclusion of 2011, the tour placed eleventh on Billboard's annual "Top 25 Tours", earning nearly $50 million with 57 shows in 2011.

Background
The tour was officially announced in November 2009. Describing the tour, Bublé stated, "The show will be bombastic, cinematic and at the same time a very intimate experience. I can't wait to get back out on the road and of course—to see my fans. I've missed them." During an interview with The Scotsman, Bublé commented on how the show wasn't a typical Las Vegas revue. The singer did not want to rely on creating a "spectacle" to create an enjoyable performance. Bublé felt that vocals were important and every thing else was a bonus. The tour marks Bublé second endeavor playing arenas in North America and Europe. Bublé wanted to create an intimate theater-styled show in the arena setting—making the show warm and inviting. Productions rehearsals were held at the Jacksonville Veterans Memorial Arena in Jacksonville, Florida from 26 February 2010 to 7 March 2010. The tour commenced on 10 March 2010 at the Amway Arena in Orlando, Florida to a sold-out crowd. The trek continued into Europe, Australia and Asia, giving nearly 150 performances to over one million spectators.

Staging
Although Bublé is regarded as a contemporary jazz artist, the staging for his recent tour resembled the staging of many rock musicians. Wanting to move away from the typical Vegas cabaret setting, the stage was designed by Mark Fisher, known for his work with Tina Turner, Pink Floyd and U2.  At 75' x 32', the stage allows ample space for a 13-piece band and an eight piece orchestra. It also includes a B-stage where the singer performs "Home". The stage features six cylindrical light towers  made with VersaTube lighting and video effects. There is also a video screen in between each columns that displays video footage of the city in which Bublé is performing. Both the video screens and columns alternate configuration throughout the show.

Opening act
Naturally 7

Setlist

Tour dates

2011

2012
{| class="wikitable" style="text-align:center;"
|+ List of concerts, showing date, city, country, venue, tickets sold, number of available tickets and amount of gross revenue
|-
! scope="col" style="width:12em;"| Date
! scope="col" style="width:10em;"| City
! scope="col" style="width:10em;"| Country
! scope="col" style="width:22em;"| Venue
! scope="col" style="width:10em;"| Attendance
! scope="col" style="width:10em;"| Revenue
|- style="background:#ddd;"
|colspan="6"|Latin America
|-
|9 March 2012
|rowspan="3"|Mexico City
|rowspan="3"|Mexico
|rowspan="3"|National Auditorium
|rowspan="3"|–
|rowspan="3"|–
|-
|10 March 2012
|-
|11 March 2012
|-
|17 March 2012
|rowspan="2"|Santiago
|rowspan="2"|Chile
|rowspan="2"|Movistar Arena
| rowspan="7" 
| rowspan="7" 
|-
|18 March 2012
|-
|21 March 2012
|Rosario
|rowspan="5"|Argentina
|Salón Metropolitano
|-
|22 March 2012
|Córdoba
|Orfeo Superdomo
|-
|24 March 2012
|rowspan="3"|Buenos Aires
|rowspan="3"|Luna Park
|-
|25 March 2012
|-
|26 March 2012
|-
|31 March 2012
|Rio de Janeiro
|rowspan="2"|Brazil
|HSBC Arena
|9,892 / 9,892
| $951,660
|-
|1 April 2012
|São Paulo
|Via Funchal
|4,978 / 4,978
| $1,008,190
|- style="background:#ddd;"
|colspan="6"|Europe|-
! scope="col" style="width:12em;"| Date
! scope="col" style="width:10em;"| City
! scope="col" style="width:10em;"| Country
! scope="col" style="width:22em;"| Venue
! scope="col" style="width:10em;"| Attendance
! scope="col" style="width:10em;"| Revenue
|-
|15 April 2012
|Herning
|Denmark
|Jyske Bank Boxen
| rowspan="9" 
| rowspan="9" 
|-
|17 April 2012
|Oslo
|Norway
|Oslo Spektrum
|-
|18 April 2012
|Stockholm
|Sweden
|Ericsson Globe
|-
|20 April 2012
|Helsinki
|Finland
|Hartwall Areena
|-
|21 April 2012
|Tallinn
|Estonia
|Saku Suurhall
|-
|23 April 2012
|Gdańsk
|Poland
|Ergo Arena
|-
|25 April 2012
|Cologne
|Germany
|Lanxess Arena
|-
|26 April 2012
|rowspan="2"|Rotterdam
|rowspan="2"|Netherlands
|rowspan="2"|Sportpaleis van Ahoy
|-
|27 April 2012
|-
|- style="background:#ddd;"
|colspan="6"|Africa'''
|-
! scope="col" style="width:12em;"| Date
! scope="col" style="width:10em;"| City
! scope="col" style="width:10em;"| Country
! scope="col" style="width:22em;"| Venue
! scope="col" style="width:10em;"| Attendance
! scope="col" style="width:10em;"| Revenue
|-
|1 May 2012
|rowspan="3"|Cape Town
|rowspan="5"|South Africa
|rowspan="3"|Grand Arena
| rowspan="5" 
| rowspan="5" 
|-
|2 May 2012
|-
|3 May 2012
|-
|5 May 2012
|rowspan="2"|North West
|rowspan="2"|Sun City Super Bowl
|-
|6 May 2012
|-
|}

Cancellations and rescheduled shows

Critical reception
Overall, Bublé received positive reviews from music critics in the United States, Canada and Australia. Scott Mervis (Pittsburgh Post-Gazette) was not impressed by Bublé's vocal prowess but felt he charmed the audience at the Peterson Events Center. He continues, "Nonetheless, he was greeted with open arms because he does offer a respite from modern-day rock and R&B. His adoring, mostly female fans got to enjoy timeless classics, rarely heard in arenas, from a charming, handsome man with sincere enthusiasm for the music. That counts for something." Jeff Hahne (Creative Loafing) called the performance at the Time Warner Cable Arena entertaining stating, "His talent for singing is matched with his abilities as an overall entertainer — silly anecdotes, jokes about his band and an unabashed honesty and humility are what make his shows so fun to watch. He addressed the crowd after the second song and asked how many men there had been dragged by their wives […] He then told the crowd he was looking to have a party — they can dance if they'd like or stand up and scream, but if someone behind you says to sit down because they're trying to see the Michael Bublé concert, turn around and tell them to go f… themselves."

James Reaney (London Free Press) called the Canadian crooner's concert at the John Labatt Centre a mixture of warmth and insanity declaring, "[Bublé] can play it beautifully straight. The man who followed Monday's sweet and soulful version of Van Morrison's 'Crazy Love' with a reverential take on Hoagy Carmichael's 'Georgia on My Mind', complete with a thrilling high-note solo from his band's trumpeter, and then pulled off Stevie Wonder's 'For Once in My Life' the way Nelson Riddle might have arranged it for Frank Sinatra is not simply a showbiz kidder." Jason MacNeil (Jam!) gave the singer's performance at the Air Canada Centre three and a half out of five stars commenting, "But Buble's first real highlight might have been following the schmaltzy 'I've Got The World On A String' when he poured himself into the tender and heartfelt 'Best Of Me', almost appearing to get choked up at some points in the song. The song led nicely into a strong cover of Van Morrison's 'Crazy Love'."

John Terauds (Toronto Star) called the same show a "work of art". He further notates, "The crooner loves to chat, and provided witty — sometimes overly personal — introductions for his accomplished band members, including a spectacular jazz wind octet. He made fun of his geeky musical predilections. He enjoyed a moment of homage to Michael Jackson." Darryl Sterdan (Winnipeg Sun) called Bublé's concert at the MTS Centre entertainment with a capitol "E", giving the performance four out of five stars, he writes, "[Bublé] may be no Sinatra — and in his defence, he claims he's never wanted to be — but he openly pays his respects to the singers and writers who blazed the trail he follows."

Jim Carnes (The Sacramento Bee) was pleased by Bublé's performance at the ARCO Arena calling the concert fun and warm. He remarks, "Backed by a fine 13-piece big band, Bublé created a surprisingly intimate club feel. Video screens gave closeups of individual musicians as well as the star. It was surprising, when he had the house lights brought up, to see just how many people were there." Kate Lucas (The Orange County Register) saw Bublé's performance at the Honda Center as a "knockout" calling the singer talented and charismatic. She further affirms, "From his powerful opening with 'Cry Me a River' to a playful take on 'Twist and Shout' as giant beach balls bounced around the crowd, Bublé let down the emotional floodgates, entwining tales of difficult breakups with jubilation over his coming nuptials (he weds Argentine actress and model Luisana Lopilato on April 6) and leading us onto the roller-coaster of his life lately. It makes sense that the show begins so dramatically, with the silhouette of a conductor and orchestra (reminiscent of the beginning of Disney's Fantasia) and an intense horn intro yielding to eruptive screams as Bublé appears and pyrotechnics scatter stars from above the stage."

Nathanael Cooper (The Courier-Mail) commended Bublé's performance at the Brisbane Entertainment Centre concluding, "As charming as he is a phenomenal singer, [Bublé] peppered his show with amusing chats about everything from his wife to the wives who had dragged their husbands to the show. Clearly, an artist who is well in touch with what his fans want, he ensured the show delivered exactly what they wanted." Paul Cashmere (Undercover FM'') gave the singer four and a half out of five stars for his show at the Rod Laver Arena. He writes, "[Bublé] was entertaining, he was funny and he was one hell of a performer. Early into the show, he invited a lady to come forward and get her sign signed. 'Look what I wrote,' he said when she returned to her seat. 'It says 'I'm your slut'. That pretty much set the tone of the night. It was a good time to be had by all."

Notes

References

External links
 Bublé's Official Website

2010 concert tours
2011 concert tours
2012 concert tours
Michael Bublé concert tours